On 21 January 1924, at 18:50 EET, Vladimir Lenin, leader of the October Revolution and the first leader and founder of the Soviet Union, died in Gorki aged 53 after falling into a coma. The official cause of death was recorded as an incurable disease of the blood vessels. Lenin was given a state funeral and then buried in a specially erected mausoleum on 27 January. A commission of the Central Committee of the RCP(b) was in charge of organising the funeral.

Funeral service 
On 23 January, the coffin with Lenin's body was transported by train from Gorki to Moscow and displayed at the Hall of Columns in the House of the Unions, and it stayed there for three days. On 27 January, the body of Lenin was delivered to Red Square, accompanied by martial music. There assembled crowds listened to a series of speeches delivered by Mikhail Kalinin, Grigory Zinoviev, and Joseph Stalin, but notably not Leon Trotsky, who had been convalescing in the Caucasus. Trotsky would later claim that he had been given the wrong date for the funeral.  Afterwards the body was placed into the vault of a temporary wooden mausoleum (soon to be replaced with present-day Lenin's Mausoleum), by the Kremlin Wall. Despite the freezing temperatures, tens of thousands attended.

Against the protestations of Nadezhda Krupskaya, Lenin's widow, Lenin's body was embalmed to preserve it for long-term public display in the Red Square mausoleum. The commander of the Moscow Garrison issued an order to place the guard of honour at the mausoleum, whereby it was colloquially referred to as the "Number One Sentry". During the embalming process, Lenin's brain had been removed; in 1925, an institute was established to dissect it, revealing that Lenin had had severe sclerosis.

Post-Soviet period 
After the events of the 1993 Russian constitutional crisis, the guard of honour was disbanded. In 2018, Russian MP Vladimir Petrov suggested that Lenin's body be buried in 2024, the 100th anniversary of his death, because it was costing the state too much money to house the body in the mausoleum and proposed it be replaced with a wax or rubber model.

Gallery

See also 
 Death and state funeral of Joseph Stalin
 Lenin's Mausoleum

References

Works cited

 
 
 
 
 
 
 
 

Vladimir Lenin
Lenin
Lenin
Lenin, Vladimir
Lenin
1924 in Moscow
1924 in the Soviet Union